Kudryk or Kudrik (Ukrainian or Russian: Кудрик) is a gender-neutral Ukrainian surname. Notable people with the surname include:

Oleh Kudryk (born 1996), Ukrainian football goalkeeper 
Peter Kudryk (born c. 1948), Canadian football player

See also
 

Ukrainian-language surnames